Rail transport in Peru has a varied history. Peruvian rail transport has never formed a true network, primarily comprising separate lines running inland from the coast and built according to freight need rather than passenger need.

Many Peruvian railroad lines owe their origins to contracts granted to United States entrepreneurs Henry Meiggs and W. R. Grace and Company but the mountainous nature of Peru made expansion slow and much of the surviving mileage is of twentieth-century origin. It was also challenging to operate, especially in the age of the steam locomotive.

In the latter part of the 1880s, the principal public railways, the Central and Southern, with others, passed to the control of the Peruvian Corporation, registered in London and controlled by Americans Michael and William R. Grace. In 1972 they were nationalized as Empresa Nacional de Ferrocarriles del Perú (ENAFER), but this survived as an operator only until 1999 when most surviving lines were privatized. Regular passenger traffic now operates over only a small proportion of the mileage.

The Tacna-Arica Railway crosses the boundary with Chile, running twice daily, once in the morning and once in the late afternoon. The Southern Railway provides connection with Bolivia by ship across Lake Titicaca.

Principal lines

The Central Railway, Ferrocarril Central del Perú (FCC), incorporates the first railway in Peru opened on May 17, 1851, linking the Pacific port of Callao and the capital Lima ( of standard gauge). This was expanded to form the Callao, Lima & Oroya Railway, opened to Chicla by 1878, the original contractor being Henry Meiggs and engineer being Ernest Malinowski assisted by Edward Jan Habich. The line reached La Oroya by 1893 and Huancayo in 1908. Since 1999 it has been operated as the Ferrocarril Central Andino (FCCA) (with its associated maintenance company Ferrovias Central Andina (FVCA)) by the Pittsburgh-registered Railroad Development Corporation. There is no regular passenger traffic but excursions are operated from the Lima Desamparados station. Both branch and spur have since closed to traffic.

The Central is extended by the Ferrocarril Huancayo - Huancavelica which was authorised in 1904 (engineer: Charles Weber) but work was interrupted during the World War I and it was not opened throughout ( of  gauge) until 1926. Work was continued but never completed on extending the line to the Pacific coast. Estimated to take 16 months, the US$33m project was to be funded jointly by the government and the Development Bank of Latin America.

Also connecting with the Central, at La Oroya, is the Cerro de Pasco railway opened in standard gauge form in 1904 to serve ore mining in the Cerro de Pasco district. It was thoroughly North American in all its operations and, although primarily a mineral line, did run a passenger operation, latterly known as the “Flamingo” from the consist purchased from the Florida East Coast Railway. The owning company was nationalised as Centromín in 1974 and operation of the railway was taken over by FCCA.  of  gauge was completed of a Tambo del Sol-Pachitea line intended eventually to extend to the head of Amazon navigation on the Ucayali River at Pucallpa; this aspiration was abandoned by the government in 1957.

The Southern Railway, Ferrocarriles del Sur del Perú (FCS), another Meiggs concession, was completed from Arequipa to Puno in 1876 and to the coast at Matarani. The railway also operated steamers (including the Yavari) and train ferries on Lake Titicaca connecting with Guaqui in Bolivia. Although work on the Juliaca–Cuzco section was begun in 1872 it was not completed through until 1908. The summit of this section is reached at La Raya ( above sea level). Since 1999 it has been operated by PeruRail, an affiliate of the Belmond Ltd. group, whose tourist trains form the only passenger services.

From Cuzco, the  gauge Ferrocarril Santa Ana (Ferrocarril Cuzco á Santa Ana) (engineer: Mauro Valderrama) was authorised in 1907, originally at  gauge, but the first section was not opened until the early 1920s. It was extended to Aguas Calientes in 1928, passing to government control in 1931. Although further extended in stages through to Quillabamba (reached in 1978), landslides (attributed to effects of El Niño) caused it to be abandoned beyond Hidroelectrica in 1998. It is now operated by PeruRail and Inca Rail, and forms the only means of access for visitors to Machu Picchu. At the beginning of 2010 it was cut by landslides.

The isolated Ferrocarril Tacna á Arica was completed in 1856. Following the War of the Pacific it and the surrounding territory passed to Chile; after a settlement in 1929 the Tacna end of the line was returned to Peru while the port of Arica remained in Chilean hands. The British concession for the line reverted to the Peruvian government during World War II. The line remained open for both passengers and freight for several decades, with a museum collection at Tacna station. The line closed in May 2012; in June 2014 the Peruvian government sought bids for redeveloping the line. Finally, in 2016 the line was reopened, offering two services daily.

PeruRail

Tren de la Costa
A regional rail line, referred to as Tren de la Costa is planned, paralleling the Pan American Highway between the cities of Sullana and Ica, via Lima.

Other lines
The newest railway in Peru is a standard gauge line opened in 1959 by the Southern Peru Copper Corporation from its opencast mine at Toquepala to the port of Ilo with a later branch largely in tunnel to its workings at Cuajone.

There were a number of other lines, all now closed, mostly for mineral or agricultural traffic, running inland from the coast north of Lima and in Pisco Province. There were also lines serving nitrate deposits in the Tarapacá Region, ceded to Chile in 1883.

Some railway exhibits, including a working   gauge pleasure line, are to be seen in the Parque de la Amistad in the Surco district of Lima.

Rail links with other countries
  Bolivia – shipping from  railhead in Puno to  railhead in Guaqui across Lake Titicaca by car float (Lake Titicaca car float).
  Chile – a semi-isolated  Tacna-Arica Railway connected Tacna, Peru to the port of Arica, Chile. The line closed in 2012, but as of June 2014, there were plans to reopen it.  
  Ecuador – none.

Metro

Lima has a standard gauge metro service called Lima Metro or Tren Eléctrico.  The line 1 is operating now with 21 km and 16 stations, the second stage of the first line is under construction, this line will reach up to 39 km in 2014.  A fast bus system called metropolitano complements this system.

A light railway Metro Wanka was partially constructed in the central Andean city of Huancayo but the project eventually failed.

See also 

 Empresa Nacional de Ferrocarriles del Peru
 Ferrocarril Central Andino
 Huancayo-Huancavelica Railway
 PeruRail
 Transport in Peru
 Lima Tramway

References

Further reading

External links 

 UN Map 
 The Tramways Of Peru

 
Transport in Peru